Hasanabad-e Layen-e Now (also Romanized as Ḩasanābād-e Lāyen-e Now; also known as Ḩasanābād) is a village in Hezarmasjed Rural District, in the Central District of Kalat County, Razavi Khorasan Province, Iran. At the 2006 census, its population was 2,664, in 646 families.

References 

Populated places in Kalat County